Style was a South African consumer magazine that was founded in 1981 and published by Caxton and CTP Publishers and Printers Limited. The magazine's founding editor was Marilyn Hattingh, who based the publication on American "city magazines", aimed at an upmarket readership of conspicuous consumers. The magazine was a chronicle of Johannesburg high society, and its tone was acerbic and often satirical. Its content was entirely South African in origin, and the writing staff included Hilary Prendini-Toffoli, Patrick Lee, Gus Silber, Adam Levin, Chris Marais, Linda Shaw and Lin Sampson. In late 2006, it was announced that the magazine would be discontinued. The magazine has often been associated with a Kugel readership.

References

1981 establishments in South Africa
2006 disestablishments in South Africa
Defunct magazines published in South Africa
Lifestyle magazines
Magazines established in 1981
Magazines disestablished in 2006
Mass media in Johannesburg
Monthly magazines published in South Africa
Women's magazines